Informatica is an American software development company founded in 1993. It is headquartered in Redwood City, California. Its core products include Enterprise Cloud Data Management and Data Integration. It was co-founded by Gaurav Dhillon and Diaz Nesamoney. Amit Walia is the company's CEO.

History 

On 29 April 1999, its Initial public offering on the NASDAQ stock exchange listed its shares under the stock symbol INFA.

On 7 April 2015, Permira and Canada Pension Plan Investment Board announced that a company controlled by the Permira funds and CPPIB would acquire Informatica for approximately US$5.3 billion.

On 6 August 2015, the acquisition was completed and Microsoft and Salesforce Ventures invested in the company as part of the deal. The company's stock ceased trading on the NASDAQ under the ticker symbol INFA effective on the same date.

On 27 October 2021, Informatica again became publicly traded with the INFA stock symbol, this time listed on the NYSE, opening at $27.55 per share.

Products 
Informatica's product portfolio is focused on data integration: extract, transform, load, information lifecycle management, business-to-business data exchange, cloud computing integration, complex event processing, data masking, data quality, data replication, data virtualization, master data management, ultra messaging, and data governance. These components form a toolset for establishing and maintaining data warehouses. It has over 9,500 customers.

In 2006, Informatica announced a "cloud business".

Financial results 

Informatica has grown through a combination of sales growth and through company acquisitions.

References

External links 

American companies established in 1993
Software companies established in 1993
Companies listed on the New York Stock Exchange
Enterprise application integration
Extract, transform, load tools
Development software companies
Data warehousing products
Data companies
Data quality companies
Software companies of the United States
Cloud computing providers
Software companies based in the San Francisco Bay Area
Companies based in Redwood City, California
1993 establishments in California
2015 mergers and acquisitions
Permira companies
CPP Investment Board companies
2021 initial public offerings
Salesforce
1999 initial public offerings